This is a list of radio stations that broadcast in Indian languages worldwide.

India 

List of Indian language radio stations in India in alphabetical order.

Mauritius

New Zealand

United States

Trinidad and Tobago

Dubai

See also 
 List of Chinese-language radio stations
 List of Tamil-language radio stations
 List of Kannada-language radio stations

References 

Hindi
Hindi
Hindi
Lists of radio stations in India
Live Indian Radio Station